The Civic Club building, now the New York Estonian House, is a four-story Beaux-Arts building located at 243 East 34th Street between Second and Third Avenues in the Murray Hill neighborhood of Manhattan in New York City.

The house was originally built for the Civic Club in 1898–1899, having been designed by Brooklyn architect Thomas A. Gray. The Civic Club was founded by the local social reformer F. Norton Goddard (1861–1905) to reduce poverty and fight against gambling in the neighborhood. After Goddard's death in 1905 the club ceased to exist, but the building remained in the Goddard family until 1946, when Frederick Norton's widow sold it for $25,000 to The New York Estonian Educational Society, Inc., which is still the owner of the house today. The building underwent a $100,000 restoration in 1992.

Known as the Estonian House, the building houses a number of Estonian organizations such as the New York Estonian School, choruses for men and women and a folk dancing group. Vaba Eesti Sõna, the largest Estonian-language newspaper in the United States, is also published at the New York Estonian House. The Estonian House has become the main center of Estonian culture on the U.S. Eastern seaboard, especially amongst Estonian-Americans.

The building was designated as a landmark by the New York City Landmarks Preservation Commission in 1978 and was added to the National Register of Historic Places in 1982.

See also
 List of Estonian Americans
 Estonia–United States relations
 Estonian House
 Estonian Consulate General in New York
 List of New York City Designated Landmarks in Manhattan from 14th to 59th Streets
 National Register of Historic Places listings in Manhattan from 14th to 59th Streets

References

External links

 
 
 New Yorgi Eesti Maja channel in YouTube
 Estonian House described by Landmarks Preservation Commission in 1978
 Images of the building in New York Architecture Images

34th Street (Manhattan)
Beaux-Arts architecture in New York City
Clubhouses on the National Register of Historic Places in Manhattan
Estonia–United States relations
Estonian culture abroad
Estonian-American history
Houses completed in 1899
Murray Hill, Manhattan
New York City Designated Landmarks in Manhattan